St. Munchin's College is a second-level education college located in Corbally, Limerick, Ireland. The school was founded in 1796. It is a Diocesan College or minor seminary.

College Crest
The college crest is shield-shaped in blue and red – the college colours. Depicted on it are: a book to show that its function was to be educational, a torch to represent the devil, a cross to show that it was to be Christian and a bishop's mitre and crozier to show that it was to be diocesan. The motto chosen was "Veritas in Caritate" adapted from Bishop Anthony Wood's own episcopal motto. The text is taken from St Paul's Letter to the Ephesians: "If we live by the truth and in love, we shall grow in all ways into Christ." (Eph 4:15)

History

"Limerick Diocesan College, under the Patronage of St. Munchin, was first founded by Most Rev. John Young, Bishop of Limerick, in 1796. After many changes, it is established on the site in Corbally by Most Rev. Henry Murphy, Bishop of Limerick, who placed the foundation stone on 28th April, 1960"

Thus reads, in English translation, the inscription to be seen on the foundation stone of St. Munchin's College, Corbally, Limerick.  It is an institution of learning with a long and noble history, stretching back over two hundred years. In this time, St. Munchin's College has indeed seen many changes, both of organisation and location.

The Diocese of Limerick was formally established at the Synod of Ráth Breasail in the year 1111. The boundaries of the diocese as arranged at that time have remained practically unchanged to the present day. The diocese includes most of County Limerick, and two parishes in Co. Clare. The patron saint of the diocese is St Munchin; tradition holds that St. Munchin was the first bishop of Limerick and he founded a cathedral which remained the principal church of the diocese until Donal O'Brien, King of Limerick, built St. Mary's Cathedral in the 12th century.

For many centuries Irish Theological Schools had been suppressed and the students for the priesthood had to be educated outside Ireland. Many famous Colleges for the education of priests were established on the continent-Lisbon, Salamanca, Paris and Rome to name just a few However, by the end of the 18th century, circumstances had changed. Firstly, the effects of the French Revolution had closed many of the seminaries abroad and secondly, the attitude of the government to the education of the Catholic clergy had changed. A bill to provide for the education of the Catholic clergy received the Royal assent on 5 June 1795. The Duke of Leinster offered a site at Maynooth, his offer was accepted and, on 1 October 1795 St. Patrick's College at Maynooth was formally opened.

At this time, in most Irish dioceses, preparatory seminaries were established, among them St. Munchin's College, Limerick. The driving force behind the establishment of the new college was Bishop John Young. On 29 September 1796, St. Munchin's College was opened at Palmerstown in Limerick City. The curriculum was made up of Logic and Divinity. It was a major seminary for those pursuing studies for the priesthood. It was some years before St. Munchin's took on the form of a Diocesan College, that is, an educational institution in which both laymen and future priests pursue their secondary studies together. The first of many changes in location was not long coming and, within six months, by March 1797, the college moved from Palmerstown to Newgate Lane where it would remain for only three years. The next site was at Peter's Cell and, by 1809, it was on the move again, this time to Park House in Corbally.

In 1825 the college at Park House closed but, its last President, opened an academy in Mallow Street. The academy was opened to lay students as well as students for the priesthood. A fully fledged St. Munchin's College was opened again in 1853, under the patronage of Bishop John Ryan. The college, known as 'St. Munchin's Diocesan Seminary' was located at No. 1 Hartstonge Street, and the college authorities were very proud of the facilities that were available:

"The seminary itself is situated in the most elevated and healthy part of the city, and no expense has been spared to fit it up in the best possible manner, for the reception of day pupils and boarders".

A wide range of subjects was on offer, including Music, Drawing, Painting, and Dancing. A major change in the running of St. Munchin's took place when Bishop Ryan decided to remove the diocesan clergy from the college. This, it would seem, was because "the priests of St. Munchin's had paid too much local attention to a local election". (Thomas Begley, Diocesan Historian)

Bishop Ryan approached the Society of Jesus with a request to take over the administration of the college. After formal negotiations were successfully concluded between the Bishop and the Society of Jesus, both in Ireland and in Rome, St Munchin's College became a Jesuit-run school on 10 March 1859. This wasn't the first venture into education by the Jesuits in Limerick. In fact, their first school in Ireland was set up in St. Mary's Parish in 1565.

By 1862 the Diocesan College moved to Crescent House where the curriculum included classical and modern languages, mathematics, physics, history, geography, and elocution. The school also had a 'Mercantile Department' in which 'an extensive and accurate knowledge is imparted of arithmetic, book-keeping, abstracts and other requirements of the actuary's office'. Young men were prepared there for 'the university and the ecclesiastical colleges, the learned professions, the public service, civil and military'.

In 1867 Bishop George Butler decided to re-establish his own seminary at Hartstonge Street and the Jesuits maintained their own school at the Crescent which was renamed the Crescent College. The two schools quickly developed a rivalry on the rugby field which survives to this day.

In the 1870s the Jesuits were again asked to administer St. Munchins, which this time moved to Mungret. This arrangement, however, was not to last and the college was again transferred to the clergy of the Diocese and moved to the former town house of Lord Limerick at Henry Street where it remained until a new school was built in the 1960s at Corbally.

Torch Magazine
Every year, transition year students in the school produce the end of year magazine called The Torch. The magazine began in 1977 and has been produced every year since. The Torch features profiles of all the 6th year students (which are written by their classmates), articles about everything that goes on in the school during the year, interviews with new teachers and students who deserve special recognition (such as captains of rugby teams) and photos from the school year. The Torch is regarded by many as one of the best student magazines in the Limerick area.

Sport

The school won the Munster Schools Junior Cup in 2018. Winning its first title in the Munster Schools Senior Cup in 1968, it has since won the cup four times. It also has 6 titles at Junior Cup level. A number of former pupils have gone on to play at international level, including Bill O'Connell, Bill Mulcahy, Larry Moloney, Colm Tucker (also a Lion), John Fitzgerald, Paul Hogan, Phil Danaher (also Irish captain), Anthony Foley (also Irish captain), Keith Wood (also a Lion and Irish captain), Jerry Flannery (also a Lion), Barry Murphy, Jeremy Staunton, Marcus Horan, Denis Hurley and Damien Varley and current Irish internationals Keith Earls (also a Lion), Donnacha Ryan and Conor Murray (also a Lion).

Alumni
 George Clancy (1977-), international rugby referee
 Niall Collins TD (1973-), Fianna Fáil member of Dáil Éireann for Limerick County since 2007
 Edmond Cotter (1852-1934), FA Cup finalist with Royal Engineers, British Army officer, Irish Volunteer
 Neil Cronin (1992-), former full time teacher at At Munchin's College, currently playing for Munster in the Pro14 and has a 1-year contract with Munster (2018-2019)
 Neil Cusack (1951-), long-distance runner and Olympian, only Irishman to win the Boston Marathon.
 Philip Danaher (1965-), former Irish international and Munster rugby player
 Keith Earls (1987-), Munster, Ireland and British and Irish Lions rugby player 
 Denis Hurley (1984-), Munster and Irish international rugby player
 John Fitzgerald (1961-), former Irish international and Munster rugby player
 Niall FitzGerald KBE (1945-), former chairman and CEO of Unilever plc until his appointment as Chairman of Reuters in 2004
 Jerry Flannery (1978-), former Ireland and Munster rugby player
 John Fleming (1948-), appointed Catholic Bishop of Killala Diocese, Co. Mayo, Ireland in 2002
 Anthony Foley (1973-2016), Ireland and Munster player
 Colm Galvin (1993-), Clare hurler and legend
 Dan Goggin (1994-), Munster rugby player
 John Gormley (1959-), leader of the Green Party (Ireland) was appointed Minister for the Environment, Heritage and Local Government in the Irish Government of 2007
 Fr. Edward Joseph Hannan, founder of Hibernian F.C.
 Marcus Horan (1977-), Ireland and Munster rugby player
 Richard Hourigan (1939-2002), former Fine Gael Senator
 Stephen Keogh (1982-), former Munster and Leinster rugby player
 Fergal Lawler (1971-), drummer with The Cranberries
 Fr. Tim Leonard (1893-1929), Columban Father violently killed by Communists in China in 1929.
 David McHugh (1955-), international rugby referee
 Bill Mulcahy (1935-), former Munster, Leinster, Ireland and British and Irish Lions rugby player
 Barry Murphy (1982-), former Munster and Irish international rugby player, member of Irish acoustic folk rock band Hermitage Green
 Conor Murray (1989-), rugby player, Munster, Ireland and British and Irish Lions
 Jeremiah Newman (1926-1995), Bishop of Limerick, President of St Patrick's College, Maynooth
 Tim O'Connor (1951-), Irish Public Servant and Diplomat. Tim was part of the Irish Government Negotiating Team for the Good Friday Agreement
 Kieran O'Donnell (1963-), member of Seanad Éireann, Fine Gael member of Dáil Éireann for Limerick City 2011-2016
 Donal O'Grady (1980-), Limerick hurler and captain
 Bishop Patrick O'Neill, former bishop of limerick
 Niall O'Shaughnessy (1955-2015), Olympic middle-distance runner
 Frank O'Mara (1960-), Olympic middle-distance runner
 Sean O Riada (1931-1971), composer
 Éamonn 'Ned' Rea (1944-), All-Ireland winning Limerick hurler
 Donnacha Ryan (1983-), Munster and Irish international rugby player
 Jeremy Staunton (1980-), Munster, Irish and Aviva Premiership rugby player
 Colm Tucker (1952-2012), former Munster, Irish international and Lions rugby player
 Damien Varley (1983-), Munster rugby player
 Dick Walsh (1934-2005), journalist, political, and assistant editor The Irish Times
 Keith Wood (1972-), former rugby player for Munster, Ireland and the British and Irish Lions. Winner of IRB International Player of the Year in 2001

References

 http://www.limerickdiocese.org/post-primary.html
 Munster Schools Rugby Senior Cup
 https://www.munsterrugby.ie/

External links
 http://www.stmunchinscollege.com/
 http://www.limerickdiocese.org/post-primary.html

Secondary schools in County Limerick
1796 establishments in Ireland
Educational institutions established in 1796